Thakin Mya (7 October 1897 – 19 July 1947) was a Burmese lawyer and politician who served as the Minister of Home Affairs and in June 1947 transferred as Minister of Finance in Myanmar's pre-independence government. Mya and six other cabinet ministers (including Prime Minister Aung San) were assassinated on 19 July 1947 in Yangon. He was unofficially considered as Deputy Prime Minister in Aung San 's Cabinet. July 19 is commemorated each year as the Martyrs' Day in Myanmar.

The Thakin Mya Park in Yangon is named after Thakin Mya.

References

Assassinated Burmese politicians
1897 births
1947 deaths
University of Yangon alumni
Anti-Fascist People's Freedom League politicians
People murdered in Myanmar
Finance ministers of Myanmar
Government ministers of Myanmar
People from Pyay Region
Burmese people of World War II